Hulleys of Baslow is a bus company based in Baslow, Derbyshire, England.

History

The origins of Hulleys can be traced back to 1914 when Henry Hulley purchased a Ford Model T taxi. In 1921 a bus was purchased to operate a service from Bakewell to Chesterfield. In 1925 a service from Bakewell to Youlgreave commenced. By 1934 further growth had seen the fleet expand to seven buses with excursions operated to York, Skegness, Southport and Blackpool. In the 1970s the business was sold to JH Woolliscroft & Sons.

Services
As at March 2020 Hulleys operate a wide network of services, centred around linking Peak District towns and villages with Sheffield, Chesterfield and Manchester, as well as networks serving Ashbourne, Bakewell and Matlock and their surrounding areas.  From 29 March 2020 Hulleys will operate a new summer weekend service linking Sheffield, Chesterfield and Bakewell to such attractions as Alton Towers and Carsington Water.

In October 2022, the firm will take over operation of routes 48 and 49 from TM Travel.

The company formerly operated the X57 Snake route.

Fleet
As at October 2020 the fleet consisted of 23 modern buses.

See also
List of bus operators of the United Kingdom

References

External links
 Company website
 

Bus operators in Derbyshire
Companies based in Derbyshire
Transport companies established in 1914
Bus operators in South Yorkshire
1914 establishments in England